Wishcraft is a 2002 American slasher film directed by Richard Wenk (credited as Danny Graves) and starring Michael Weston and Alexandra Holden. The screenplay concerns a teenager who receives a talisman that gives him three wishes.

Plot
A high school student named Brett Bumpers (Weston) receives a mysterious package one day. It contains a bull penis totem with a note explaining that it will grant him three wishes. His first wish is for Samantha (Alexandra Holden) to go with him to a spring dance. The next day, Samantha invites him to the dance, and he suspects that his wish has come true. Samantha's boyfriend Cody is the star jock at the school, and he is humiliated by Samantha's decision.

After the dance, one of Cody's buddies is murdered by a cloaked figure with a grotesquely disfigured face. When Brett drops Samantha off at home, she suggests that they should return to just being friends. Heartbroken, Brett makes his second wish that Samantha would become his girlfriend and actually fall in love with him. The next day, Samantha breaks up with Cody and initiates a relationship with Brett. Meanwhile, the cloaked figure continues to kill students at the high school.

Feeling guilty about wishing Samantha into a relationship, Brett confesses the truth to her. As Samantha is coming to grips with the truth, the cloaked figure attacks the pair. He lures Brett away from Samantha and then reveals himself to be Brett's history teacher, Mr. Turner (Austin Pendleton). Mr. Turner explains that he bought the totem and discovered that it actually granted wishes. He wished his wife dead, to avoid divorcing her. Then he wished for "Fuck-you-money", and he promptly got $100 million which he hid in a Swiss bank account. Mr. Turner confessed that he also wished for supernatural strength, because he decided to kill problem students at the school. As he was killing the students on his list, he sent the totem to Brett because he was an exemplary student. If the totem is given to another person, that person can also make three wishes.

Mr. Turner then reveals that Samantha is the last name on his list. Just as he is about to kill Samantha, Brett makes his third wish, asking for more strength and agility than Mr. Turner. The two struggle, and eventually, Brett kills Mr. Turner with a samurai sword. Brett gives the totem to Samantha so that she is not forced to love him against her will. She uses the totem to begin their relationship again, but this time, on her own terms.

Cast

Reception
Website Beyond Hollywood gave the film a positive review, stating: "The film doesn’t have the Hollywood slick and gloss, but it makes up for the lack of visual polish with a surprisingly good script and an all-around good cast." Eye for Film gave Wishcraft two out of film stars, saying that only fans of the genre would enjoy the film: "Perhaps dedicated fans of the genre might find some solace in the films use of the old horror clichés, but I don't think anyone else will. Still, at least there's plenty of suspects for you to play Guess The Psycho..." Luisito Joaquín González from Slash Above also reviewed the film, concluding: "Of the myriad of Scream imitators that were unleashed during the early noughties, Wishcraft is most definitely not one of the worst that you can place your hands upon. Weston and Holden make for an agreeable pairing and the film is worth seeing for maintaining an impressive pace and generating moments of unique humour. It is an ok time-waster rather than a good one and I can’t help but feel that it tries too hard to have one over on Wes Craven and Kevin Williamson."

References

External links
 

2002 films
2002 horror films
American supernatural horror films
2000s English-language films
Films about wish fulfillment
Films shot in Los Angeles
Films directed by Richard Wenk
Films scored by J. Peter Robinson
Gold Circle Films films
2000s American films